Megan Huff (born April 17, 1996) is an American basketball player. Born in Federal Way, Washington, Huff went to Todd Beamer High School and played collegiately for the University of Hawaii and the University of Utah. She was drafted by the New York Liberty with the 26th overall pick of the 2019 WNBA draft. She played most recently for the Las Vegas Aces.

College career
In 2013, Huff committed to University of Hawaii as a two-sport athlete and the goal "to be a pro volleyball player." In her first year at University of Hawaii, she played on both the volleyball and basketball teams and was named UH's Rookie of the Year for her performance on both teams, as well as Big West's Sixth Player of the Year in the sport of basketball. In her second season of basketball at Hawaii, she led the team in double-doubles (4) and blocks (33) and earned Big West Sixth Player of the Year honors for a second consecutive year. In 2016, Huff announced she was transferring to University of Utah to continue her basketball career. At Utah, Huff became a consistent starter and earned the label "quiet superstar." In two seasons at Utah, she scored over 1,000 points and was named  to the All-Pac-12 first team twice.

Hawai'i and Utah statistics

Source

Professional career

Huff was drafted by the New York Liberty with the 26th overall pick of the 2019 WNBA draft. She appeared in all four preseason games leading up to the 2019 season, but was waived by the Liberty before the season began. During the 2019–2020 winter season, Huff played in Latvia for TTT Riga. On March 14, 2020, she signed a training camp contract with the Connecticut Sun, however she was waived by the team on May 25. On June 17, Huff signed with the Minnesota Lynx. On July 28, Huff made her WNBA debut, playing three minutes in a loss to Seattle. On August 6, Huff was waived by the Lynx to clear a roster spot for Odyssey Sims, who returned to the team after maternity leave. On August 11, Huff signed with the Las Vegas Aces. On August 17, Las Vegas waived Huff.

WNBA career statistics

Regular season

|-
| align="left" | 2020
| align="left" | Minnesota
| 3 || 0 || 1.7 || .000 || .000 || .000 || 1.0 || 0.3 || 0.0 || 0.0 || 0.0 || 0.0
|-
| align="left" | 2020
| align="left" | Las Vegas
| 4 || 0 || 2.8 || .000 || .000 || .000 || 0.3 || 0.0 || 0.0 || 0.0 || 0.8 || 0.0
|-
| align="left" | Career
| align="left" | 1 year, 2 teams
| 7 || 0 || 2.3 || .000 || .000 || .000 || 0.6 || 0.1 || 0.0 || 0.0 || 0.4 || 0.0

References 

1996 births
Living people
American expatriate basketball people in Latvia
American women's basketball players
Basketball players from Utah
Basketball players from Washington (state)
Hawaii Rainbow Wahine basketball players
Las Vegas Aces players
Minnesota Lynx players
New York Liberty draft picks
People from Federal Way, Washington
Utah Utes women's basketball players